The Muẓaffarids (or Muẓaffar dynasty) were a Muslim dynasty that ruled the Banaadir coast with their capital at Mogadishu from the late 15th or early 16th century until around 1624 or possibly as late as 1700. They were of Persian extraction that mixed with the local Somali population and are related to the Ajuran clan. They were effectively independent, but allied to the more powerful Ajuran Sultanate. They resisted the Portuguese, but occasionally paid them tribute. In the 17th century, the Muẓaffarids were conquered by the Somali Abgaal.

The Muẓaffarid is the second known dynasty of Mogadishu. Its first attested ruler, ʿUmar al-Malik al-Muẓaffar, bore the title of sultan. He is known from his coins. Coins were minted throughout the Muẓaffarid period. The prosperity of Mogadishu during this time stemmed from its status as a trade link between the interior and the sea and its alliance with Ajuran. The city, however, was already in decline when the Muẓaffarids took over.

Notes

Bibliography

15th-century establishments in Africa
17th-century disestablishments in Africa
History of Somalia
Iranian Muslim dynasties